Chiloquin High School is a public high school in Chiloquin, Oregon, United States. Many of the students are members of the Klamath tribes.

Academics
In 2008, 87% of the school's seniors received a high school diploma. Of 39 students, 34 graduated, four dropped out, and one was still in high school the following year.

Athletics 
Chiloquin's high school athletic program began around the time the school did.  The school's mascot is the Panther and the team colors are black and Columbia blue, somewhat identical to the NFL's Carolina Panthers, minus the silver.  The girls adopted the team name of the "Queens".

The school is a member in good standing of the Oregon School Activities Association and participates in the Southern Cascade League.  All teams currently play in Class 1A based on school enrollment.

References

High schools in Klamath County, Oregon
Public high schools in Oregon
Public middle schools in Oregon